Turkey bacon is a meat prepared from chopped, formed, cured, and smoked turkey, commonly marketed as a low-fat alternative to pork bacon; it may also be used as a substitute for bacon where  religious dietary laws (for example halal in Islam and kashrut in Judaism) forbid the consumption of pork products.

Preparation

Turkey bacon can be cooked by pan-frying or deep-frying. Cured turkey bacon made from dark meat can be 90% fat free. It can be used in the same manner as bacon (such as in a BLT sandwich), but the low fat content of turkey bacon means it does not shrink while being cooked and has a tendency to stick to the pan, thus making deep-frying a faster and more practical option.

Alternative to pork bacon
Turkey bacon is lower in fat and calories than pork bacon, but its lower fat content makes it unsuitable in some situations, such as grilling. It is also known as "facon" , which is amalgamation of the words "fake" and "bacon". As a lower fat alternative, it became popular in America in the early 90s.

Turkey bacon is an alternative also for people who do not eat pork for religious or dietary reasons. Pork is haram (not halal) to Muslims and treyf (not kosher) to Jews. When Beautiful Brands International, a company from Tulsa, Oklahoma, signed a deal with a Saudi Arabian firm to open 120 locations in eight countries in the Middle East, they had to substitute pork bacon with halal turkey bacon in their recipes at Camille's Sidewalk Cafe locations because Islamic customs forbid consumption of pork and non-halal meat.

Nutritional value
Two strips of Butterball turkey bacon contain 3 grams of fat and 50 calories (32% of which from fat); turkey bacon from Louis Rich and Mr. Turkey contain 5 and 4 grams of fat, respectively, per two slices. By comparison, two strips of regular pork bacon contain, on average, some 7 grams of fat. Andrew Smith, in The Turkey: An American Story, notes that turkey products (including turkey bacon) contain, on average twice as much sodium as the pork products they replace.

See also

 List of smoked foods

References

Poultry dishes
Bacon
Smoked meat